Strasserism ( or Straßerismus) is a strand of Nazism calling for a more radical, mass-action and worker-based form of the ideology, espousing economic antisemitism above other antisemitic forms, to achieve a national rebirth. It derived its name from Gregor and Otto Strasser, two brothers initially associated with this position.

Otto Strasser, who opposed on strategic grounds the views of Adolf Hitler, was expelled from the Nazi Party in 1930 and entered exile in Czechoslovakia, while Gregor Strasser was murdered in Nazi Germany on 30 June 1934 during the Night of the Long Knives, a violent operation against many of Hitler's opponents, including the Strasserist elements nationwide. Strasserism remains an active position within strands of postwar global neo-Nazism.

Strasser brothers

Gregor Strasser 

Gregor Strasser (1892–1934) began his career in ultranationalist politics by joining the Freikorps after serving in World War I. Strasser was involved in the Kapp Putsch and formed his own völkischer Wehrverband ("popular defense union") which he merged into the Nazi Party in 1921. Initially a loyal supporter of Adolf Hitler, he took part in the Beer Hall Putsch and held a number of high positions in the Nazi Party. However, Strasser soon became a strong advocate of the radical wing of the party, arguing that the national revolution should also include strong action to tackle poverty and should seek to build working class support. After Adolf Hitler's rise to power, Ernst Röhm, who headed the Sturmabteilung (SA), then the most important paramilitary wing of the Nazi Party, called for a second revolution aimed at removing the elites from control. This was opposed by the German conservative movement as well as by some Nazis who preferred an ordered authoritarian regime to the radical and disruptive program proposed by the party's radicals. Strasser was killed during the Night of the Long Knives in 1934.

Otto Strasser 

Otto Strasser (1897–1974) had also been a member of the Freikorps, but he joined the Social Democratic Party of Germany and fought against the Kapp Putsch. Strasser joined the Nazi Party in 1925, where he kept promoting the importance of socialism in National Socialism. Considered more of a radical than his brother, Strasser was expelled by the Nazi Party in 1930 and set up the Black Front, his own dissident group which called for a specifically German nationalist form of socialist revolution. Strasser fled Germany in 1933 to live firstly in Czechoslovakia and then Canada before returning to West Germany in later life, all the while writing prolifically about Hitler and what he saw as his betrayal of Nazism's ideals.

Ideology 
The name Strasserism came to be applied to the form of Nazism associated with the Strasser brothers. Although they had been involved in the creation of the National Socialist Program of 1920, both men called on the party to commit to "breaking the shackles of finance capital". This opposition to what Nazis termed Finanzkapitalismus (finance capitalism) and raffendes Kapital (which translates roughly to "money-grubbing capitalism", and was implied to mean "Jewish capitalism"), which they contrasted to producerism or what was termed "productive capitalism", was shared by Adolf Hitler, who borrowed it from Gottfried Feder.

This populist form of economic antisemitism was espoused by Otto Strasser in Nationalsozialistische Briefe, published in 1925, which discussed notions of class conflict, wealth redistribution and a possible alliance with the Soviet Union. His 1930 follow-up Ministersessel oder Revolution (Cabinet Seat or Revolution) attacked Hitler's betrayal of the socialist aspect of Nazism as well as criticizing the notion of the Führerprinzip. Whilst Gregor Strasser echoed many of the calls of his brother, his influence on the ideology was lower, owing to his remaining in the Nazi Party longer and to his early death. Meanwhile, Otto Strasser continued to expand his argument, calling for the break-up of large estates and the development of something akin to a guild socialism, and the related establishment of a Reich cooperative chamber to take a leading role in economic planning.

Strasserism became a strand of Nazism holding on to previous Nazi ideals such as antisemitism and palingenetic ultranationalism, but adding a strong critique of capitalism on economic antisemitic grounds and framed this in the demand for a more worker-based approach to economics. However, it is disputed whether Strasserism was a distinct form of Nazism. According to historian Ian Kershaw, "the leaders of the SA [which included Gregor Strasser] did not have another vision of the future of Germany or another politic to propose". The Strasserites advocated the radicalization of the Nazi regime and the toppling of the German elites, calling Hitler's rise to power a half-revolution which needed to be completed.

Influence

In Finland
One of the Finnish Nazi parties, National Socialist Union of Finland, was close to the left wing of the Nazi party, and the party "Chief" Yrjö Ruutu demanded the nationalization of large companies and other assets vital for national interests, a self-sufficient planned economy and parliament controlled by trade unions and the appointment of technocrats to ministers. All Nazi parties in Finland were dissolved as contrary to Article 21 of the Moscow Armistice, which forbade fascist parties. Some former members of Ruutu's party, such as Yrjö Kilpeläinen and Unto Varjonen became prominent figures in right-wing faction of the post-war Social Democratic Party of Finland. Another prominent former member Vietti Nykänen became the vice chairman of the Radical People's Party. Member of the board of the party Heikki Waris later became Minister of Social Affairs in Von Fieandt Cabinet. Although "Ruutuite" socialism never became a mass movement, it is considered to have had a considerable influence on the ideology of the Academic Karelia Society and president Urho Kekkonen.

In Germany 

During the 1970s, the ideas of Strasserism began to be referred to more in European far-right groups as younger members with no ties to Hitler and a stronger sense of economic antisemitism came to the fore. Strasserite thought in Germany began to emerge as a tendency within the National Democratic Party of Germany (NPD) during the late 1960s. These Strasserites played a leading role in securing the removal of Adolf von Thadden from the leadership and after his departure the party became stronger in condemning Hitler for what it saw as his move away from socialism in order to court business and army leaders.

Although initially adopted by the NPD, Strasserism soon became associated with more peripheral extremist figures, notably Michael Kühnen, who produced a 1982 pamphlet Farewell to Hitler which included a strong endorsement of the idea. The People's Socialist Movement of Germany/Labour Party, a minor extremist movement that was outlawed in 1982, adopted the policy. Its successor movement, the Nationalist Front, did likewise, with its ten-point programme calling for an "anti-materialist cultural revolution" and an "anti-capitalist social revolution" to underline its support for the idea. The Free German Workers' Party also moved towards these ideas under the leadership of Friedhelm Busse in the late 1980s.

The flag of the Strasserite movement Black Front and its symbol a crossed hammer and a sword has been used by German and other European neo-Nazis abroad as a substitute for the more infamous Nazi flag which is banned in some countries such as Germany.

In the United Kingdom 
Strasserism emerged in the United Kingdom in the early 1970s and centred on the National Front (NF) publication Britain First, the main writers of which were David McCalden, Richard Lawson and Denis Pirie. Opposing the leadership of John Tyndall, they formed an alliance with John Kingsley Read and ultimately followed him into the National Party (NP). The NP called for British workers to seize the right to work and offered a fairly Strasserite economic policy. Nonetheless, the NP was short-lived. Due in part to Read's lack of enthusiasm for Strasserism, the main exponents of the idea drifted away.

The idea was reintroduced to the NF by Andrew Brons in the early 1980s when he decided to make the party's ideology clearer. However, Strasserism was soon to become the province of the radicals in the Official National Front, with Richard Lawson brought in a behind-the-scenes role to help direct policy. This Political Soldier wing ultimately opted for the indigenous alternative of distributism, but their strong anti-capitalist rhetoric as well as that of their International Third Position successor demonstrated influences from Strasserism. From this background emerged Troy Southgate, whose own ideology and those of related groups such as the English Nationalist Movement and National Revolutionary Faction were influenced by Strasserism. He has also described himself as a post-Strasserite.

Elsewhere 

Third Position groups, whose inspiration is generally more Italian in derivation, have often looked to Strasserism, owing to their strong opposition to capitalism based on economic antisemitic grounds. This was noted in France, where the student group Groupe Union Défense and the more recent Renouveau français both extolled Strasserite economic platforms.

Attempts to reinterpret Nazism as having a left-wing base have also been heavily influenced by this school of thought, notably through the work of Povl Riis-Knudsen, who produced the Strasser-influenced work National Socialism: A Left-Wing Movement in 1984.

In the United States, Tom Metzger, a white supremacist, had some affiliation to Strasserism, having been influenced by Kühnen's pamphlet. Also in the United States, Matthew Heimbach of the former Traditionalist Worker Party identifies as a Strasserist. Heimbach often engages primarily in anti-capitalist rhetoric during public speeches instead of overt antisemitism, anti-Masonry or anti-communist rhetoric. Heimbach was expelled from the National Socialist Movement due to his economic views being seen by the group as too left-wing. Heimbach stated that the NSM "essentially want it to remain a politically impotent white supremacist gang".

See also 
 Beefsteak Nazi
 Movimento de Acção Nacional (MAN) (in Portugal)
 National-anarchism
 National Bolshevism
 Fascist syndicalism
 
 
 Terza Posizione (in Italy)
 Troisième Voie (in France)

References

Further reading 

 
 
 
 
 

 
Eponymous political ideologies
Economic antisemitism
Far-right politics in Germany
Nazism
Neo-fascism
Neo-Nazi concepts
Syncretic political movements